Jaquirana Remo is an extinct indigenous language once spoken in the Brazilian Amazon Basin, near the border with Peru.

References

Indigenous languages of Western Amazonia
Panoan languages
Extinct languages of South America